Bhardaha   is a local town of Hanumannagar Kankalini Municipality in Saptari District of Madhesh Province in Nepal. At the time of the 2022 Nepal census it had a population of 14,564 people living in 7,239 individual households.

Tourism 
 Kankalini Temple - It is one of the famous  Shaktipithas of Nepal. Millions of pilgrims come to worship and visit this temple yearly from Nepal and  India.
 Koshi River and Koshi Barrage - Koshi is the largest river of Nepal and the barrage made over this river have 56 gates and this barrage is so much attractive. So many people come to visit and celebrate picnic and holidays on bank of this river.
 Banana Orchard - The banana of Bhardaha has become  so famous in  Nepal in few years of beginning of banana farming also in India near border side. The green view of banana orchard is so attractive.
 Koshi Tappu Wildlife Reserve.                    * Shiv mandir -    It is one of the famous  shivalay khoshi koloni bhardah .  Shree shree 108shree bhadreshwarnatha shiv mandir ..

Economy 
The economy of Bhardians are basically depends  on farming. Many people  (above 60%) are involved in banana farming. Remaining population are involved in other types of farming and local business. The lifestyle of people of Bhardians are medium. Village is full of middle-class families.

Notable people
 C. K. Raut – social activist, author and computer scientist

References

Populated places in Saptari District
VDCs in Saptari District